Diego Jonathan Yepez Arellano (born ) is a Mexican male  track cyclist. He competed in the madison event at the 2014 UCI Track Cycling World Championships.

References

External links
 Profile at cyclingarchives.com

1989 births
Living people
Mexican track cyclists
Mexican male cyclists
Place of birth missing (living people)
Cyclists at the 2011 Pan American Games
Cyclists at the 2015 Pan American Games
Pan American Games competitors for Mexico
Competitors at the 2014 Central American and Caribbean Games